Masons Arms is the name of:

 Mason's Arms, Battersea, a pub in London
 Masons Arms, York, a pub in Yorkshire